Titanoeca is a genus of spiders that occurs mainly in Eurasia, with three species found only in North America (T. americana, T. brunnea, T. nigrella). One species (T. nivalis) has a holarctic distribution, and T. guayaquilensis is endemic to Ecuador.

The species formerly known as Titanoeca obscura was renamed to T. quadriguttata.

Species
 Titanoeca altaica Song & Zhou, 1994 — China
 Titanoeca americana Emerton, 1888 — North America
 Titanoeca asimilis Song & Zhu, 1985 — Russia, Mongolia, China
 Titanoeca brunnea Emerton, 1888 — United States, Canada
 Titanoeca caucasica Dunin, 1985 — Azerbaijan
 Titanoeca decorata Yin & Bao, 2001 — China
 Titanoeca eca Marusik, 1995 — Kazakhstan
 Titanoeca flavicoma L. Koch, 1872 — Palearctic
 Titanoeca guayaquilensis Schmidt, 1971 — Ecuador
 Titanoeca gyirongensis Hu, 2001 — China
 Titanoeca hispanica Wunderlich, 1995 — Spain, France
 Titanoeca incerta (Nosek, 1905) — Bulgaria, Turkey
 Titanoeca lehtineni Fet, 1986 — Central Asia
 Titanoeca lianyuanensis Xu, Yin & Bao, 2002 — China
 Titanoeca liaoningensis Zhu, Gao & Guan, 1993 — China
 Titanoeca mae Song, Zhang & Zhu, 2002 — China
 Titanoeca minuta Marusik, 1995 — Kazakhstan
 Titanoeca monticola (Simon, 1870) — Portugal, Spain, France
 Titanoeca nigrella (Chamberlin, 1919) — North America
 Titanoeca nivalis Simon, 1874 — Holarctic
 Titanoeca palpator Hu & Li, 1987 — China
 Titanoeca praefica (Simon, 1870) — Spain, France, Algeria, Russia
 Titanoeca psammophila Wunderlich, 1993 — Central Europe
 Titanoeca quadriguttata (Hahn, 1833) — Palearctic
 Titanoeca schineri L. Koch, 1872 — Palearctic
 Titanoeca transbaicalica Danilov, 1994 — Russia
 Titanoeca tristis L. Koch, 1872 — Europe to Central Asia
 Titanoeca turkmenia Wunderlich, 1995 — Iran, Turkmenistan
 Titanoeca ukrainica Guryanova, 1992 — Ukraine
 Titanoeca veteranica Herman, 1879 — Eastern Europe to Central Asia
 Titanoeca zyuzini Marusik, 1995 — Russia, Mongolia

References
 Platnick, Norman I. (2008). The world spider catalog, version 8.5. American Museum of Natural History.

Titanoecidae
Araneomorphae genera
Spiders of Europe
Spiders of Asia
Spiders of North America
Spiders of South America